Girls Cruise is an American reality television series. It stars rapper Lil' Kim who serves as executive producer along with singers Mýa and Chilli of TLC. Announced in February 2019, Girls Cruise finds Lil' Kim and her celebrity friends embarking on a vacation of a lifetime in the series described as one of self-exploration and sisterhood.

Synopsis
"As they travel through the Caribbean, the crew hits the high seas on an epic journey filled with hilarious adventures, emotional breakthroughs, and spicy romances as they cultivate bonds and unapologetically live their best lives."

Cast
 Lil' Kim – a Grammy Award winner and the first woman in hip hop to score three consecutive Billboard “Hot Rap Songs” number-one singles. She's a multi-platinum rapper, actress and fashion icon who remains one of the most influential people in pop culture. Lil' Kim released her fifth studio album, "9," in October 2019.
 Mýa – a Grammy Award-winning international R&B & pop superstar and actress who broke into the mainstream with her platinum self-titled record. In addition to an extensive discography and film resume, Mýa has recently emerged as a leader in vegan lifestyle activism.
 Chilli – a singer-songwriter, dancer and entrepreneur. In addition to being a member of the renowned and Grammy Award-winning musical group, TLC, Chilli is the founder of a nonprofit group, Chilli's Crew, which works with young girls in Atlanta.
 Pretty Vee – a rapper and comedian who stars on MTV's Wild 'N Out. She rose to prominence through her viral skits and characters, and has become a popular act in parody.
 B. Simone – a rising comedian who also stars on MTV's Wild 'N Out. 
 Tiffany – an actress, model, host, dancer and entrepreneur with a long-standing friendship with Lil' Kim.
 Char DeFrancesco – a philanthropist, socialite, former model and entrepreneur.

Episodes

Reception

Critical
Girls Cruise received generally favorable reviews. Writing for Vogue, Christian Allaire commented, "Girls Cruise is our next obsession." Similarly, Glamour called the show "addictive." While The Source noted Girls Cruise as a glamorous vacation of a lifetime." Revolt TV echoed the same sentiment and commented, Girls Cruise is "sure to be epic."

Awards and nominations
Girls Cruise received two National Film & Television Award (NFTA) nominations for Best Reality Show and Best Entertainment Show. It won Best Entertainment Show. In January 2020, Girls Cruise received a Guild of Music Supervisors Awards nomination for Best Music Supervision In Reality Television.

References

External links

2010s American reality television series
2019 American television series debuts
Lil' Kim
Mýa
TLC (group) members
English-language television shows
VH1 original programming
2019 American television series endings